Hold It Down is the third album by Brooklyn-based rap duo Das EFX, released in 1995 via East West Records.  It contains production from DJ Premier, Pete Rock, and Easy Mo Bee.

The track "Represent the Real," featuring KRS-One, is the same version that appears on KRS-One's 1995 album KRS-One.

Track listing

Chart performance

Album

Singles

References

1995 albums
Das EFX albums
Albums produced by DJ Scratch
Albums produced by Easy Mo Bee
Albums produced by DJ Premier
Albums produced by Pete Rock
Elektra Records albums